Hajj Qeshlaq (also Romanized as Ḩājj Qeshlāq; also known as Hāj, Ḩājī Qeshlāq, Ḩājjī Qeshlāq, and Hāz Qishlāq) is a village in Ijrud-e Pain Rural District, Halab District, Ijrud County, Zanjan Province, Iran. At the 2006 census, its population was 166, in 35 families.

References 

Populated places in Ijrud County